The Aral Sea was an endorheic lake lying between Kazakhstan (Aktobe and Kyzylorda Regions) in the north and Uzbekistan (Karakalpakstan autonomous region) in the south which began shrinking in the 1960s and had largely dried up by the 2010s. The name roughly translates as "Sea of Islands", referring to over 1,100 islands that had dotted its waters. In the Mongolic and Turkic languages, aral means "island, archipelago". The Aral Sea drainage basin encompasses Uzbekistan and parts of Tajikistan, Turkmenistan, Kyrgyzstan, Kazakhstan, Afghanistan, and Iran.

By 2007, it had declined to 10% of its original size, splitting into four lakes: the North Aral Sea, the eastern and western basins of the once far larger South Aral Sea, and the smaller intermediate Barsakelmes Lake.

By 2009, the southeastern lake had disappeared and the southwestern lake had retreated to a thin strip at the western edge of the former southern sea. In subsequent years occasional water flows have led to the southeastern lake sometimes being replenished to a small degree. Satellite images by NASA in August 2014 revealed that for the first time in modern history the eastern basin of the Aral Sea had completely dried up. The eastern basin is now called the Aralkum Desert.

In an ongoing effort in Kazakhstan to save and replenish the North Aral Sea, the Dike Kokaral dam was completed in 2005. Salinity has dropped, and fish are again present in sufficient numbers for some fishing to be viable.

Former United Nations Secretary General Ban Ki-moon called the shrinking of the Aral Sea "one of the planet's worst environmental disasters". The region's once-prosperous fishing industry has been devastated, bringing unemployment and economic hardship. The Aral Sea region is heavily polluted, with consequent serious public health problems. UNESCO has added historical documents concerning the Aral Sea to its Memory of the World Register as a resource to study the environmental tragedy.

Formation
The Amu Darya river flowed into the Caspian Sea via the Uzboy channel until the Holocene. Geographer Nick Middleton believes it did not begin to flow into the Aral Sea until that time.

Ecology

Native fish 
Despite its former vast size, the Aral Sea had relatively low indigenous biodiversity. However, the Aral Sea basin had an exceptional array of endemic fish subspecies (as well as the three endemic sturgeon species). Most of these still survive in the North Aral Sea, but some, such as the sturgeons, have been decimated or even driven to extinction by the lake's shrinkage. Native fish species of the lake included ship sturgeon (Acipenser nudiventris), all three Pseudoscaphirhynchus sturgeon species, Aral trout (Salmo trutta aralensis), northern pike (Esox lucius), ide (Leuciscus idus oxianus), asp (Aspius aspius iblioides), common rudd (Scardinius erythropthalmus), Turkestan barbel (Luciobarbus capito conocephalus), Aral barbel (L. brachycephalus brachycephalus), common bream (Abramis brama orientalis), white-eyed bream (Ballerus sapa aralensis), Danube bleak (Chalcalburnus chalcoides aralensis), ziege (Pelecus cultratus), crucian carp (Carassius carassius gibelio), common carp (Cyprinus carpio aralensis), Wels catfish (Silurus glanis), Ukrainian stickleback (Pungitius platygaster aralensis), zander (Sander lucioperca), European perch (Perca fluviatilis), and Eurasian ruffe (Gymnocephalus cernuus). All these fish aside from the stickleback lived an anadramous or semi-anadromous lifestyle.

The salinity increase and drying of the lake led to the local extinction of the Aral trout, ruffe, Turkestan barbel, and all sturgeon species, and dams now block their return and migration routes; the Aral trout and Syr Darya sturgeon (Pseudoscaphirhynchus fedtschenkoi) may be extinct due to their restricted range. All other native fish, barring the stickleback (which persisted during the lake's shrinkage and salinity increase), were also extirpated, but many have returned to the North Aral Sea following its recovery from the 1990s onwards.

Introduced fish 

Other salt-tolerant fish species were intentionally or inadvertently introduced during the 1960s when hydropower and irrigation projects reduced the flow of fresh water thereby increasing salinity. These include the Baltic herring (Clupea harengus membras), big-scale sand smelt (Atherina boyeri caspia), black-striped pipefish (Syngnatus abaster caspius), Caucasian dwarf goby (Knipowitschia caucasica), monkey goby (Neogobius fluviatilis), round goby (N. melanostomus), Syrman goby (N. syrman), bighead goby (Ponticola kessleri), tubenose goby (Proterorchinus marmoratus), grass carp (Ctenopharyngodon idella), silver carp (Hypophtalmichthys molitrix), bighead carp (H. nobilis), black carp (Mylopharyngodon piceus), and northern snakehead (Channa argus warpachowski).

The herring, sand smelt, and gobies were the first planktivorous fish in the lake, leading to a collapse of the lake's zooplankton population. This in turn caused a collapse of the herring and sand smelt population from which neither species has recovered. All introduced species aside from the carp, snakehead, and (possibly) pipefish survived the lake's shrinkage and salinity increase, and during this time the European flounder (Platichthys flesus) was introduced to revive fisheries. The extirpated species (aside from possibly the pipefish) returned to the North Aral Sea following its recovery. Herring, sand smelt, gobies and flounder persisted in the South Aral Sea until increasing salinity extirpated all but the gobies.

Invertebrates 

Prior to its shrinkage, the Aral Sea had about 250 species of native aquatic invertebrates, the majority (about 80%) being freshwater species; the rest were marine invertebrates with ties to the Ponto-Caspian and Mediterranean-Atlantic fauna. The dominant species (excluding protozoa) were rotifers, cladocerans, and copepods. Advanced crustaceans (Malacostraca) were represented by a single amphipod species, Dikerogammarus aralensis, an endemic of the Syr Darya basin. There were several native bivalves in the Aral Sea, including members of the genera Dreissena (including an endemic subspecies of zebra mussel, Dreissena polymorpha aralensis), Hypanis, and the lagoon cockle (Cerastoderma glaucum) (formerly considered distinct species Cerastoderma rhomboides and C. isthmica). Native gastropods included Theodoxus pallasi and a member of Caspiohydrobia.

Many of these invertebrates had their numbers drastically reduced due to the introduced fish species. Later, during an unsuccessful attempt to introduce mullet (Mugil sp.) to the Aral from the Caspian Sea, the rockpool shrimp (Palaemon elegans) was inadvertently introduced to the sea. The shrimp is thought to be responsible for the extirpation of the near-endemic amphipod Dikerogammarus aralensis, which now survives only in the Syr Darya basin. The copepod Calanipeda aquaedulcis was introduced to the Aral to replace the zooplankton species reduced by the herring population, and the North American mud crab Rhithropanopeus harrisii was inadvertently introduced during this attempt as well.

Later, as the lake's salinity increased, many of the freshwater-adapted species disappeared, only leaving behind the marine and saline species. However, the zooplankton population in the North Aral Sea has recovered as salinity has decreased from the 1990s onwards, with extirpated crustacean and rotifer species returning naturally via the Syr Darya River, at the expense of the saltwater species. The cladoceran Moina mongolica, extirpated by the introduced fish species, has also returned. The zebra mussel (Dreissena polymorpha aralensis) has been reintroduced. In contrast, in the South Aral Sea only a few nematodes, rotifers, and parthenogenic brine shrimp (Artemia parthenogenetica) exist. The future prospects for aquatic invertebrates in all remaining Aral Sea fragments depend on their future changes in salinity.

History

Climate shifts have driven multiple phases of sea-level rise and fall. Inflow rates from the Amu Darya and Syr Darya are affected by glacial melt rates at the rivers' headwaters as well as precipitation within the river basins; cold, dry climates restrict both processes. Geologically driven shifts in the course of the Amu Darya between the Aral Sea and the Sarykamysh basins and anthropogenic water withdrawal from Amu Darya and Syr Darya have caused fluctuations in the Aral Sea's water level. Artificial irrigation systems began in ancient times and continue to the present.

The Aral Sea was part of the western frontier of the Chinese Empire during the Tang dynasty.

Muslim geographers, such as Hafiz-i Abru, wrote about the disappearance of the Aral Sea in 1417 due to diversions in both the Amu Darya and Syr Darya.

The Russian expedition of Alexey Butakov performed the first observations of the Aral Sea in 1848. The first steamer arrived in the Aral Sea three years later. The Aral Sea fishing industry began with the renowned Russian dealers Lapshin, Ritkin, Krasilnikov, and Makeev, which later formed major fishing unions.

Naval

Russian naval presence on the Aral Sea began in 1847 with the founding of Raimsk, soon renamed Fort Aralsk, near the mouth of the Syr Darya. As the Aral Sea basin is not connected to other bodies of water, the Imperial Russian Navy deployed its vessels by disassembling them in Orenburg on the Ural River and transporting them overland to be reassembled at Aralsk. The first two ships, assembled in 1847, were the two-masted schooners Nikolai and Mikhail. The former was a warship; the latter a merchant vessel to establish fisheries. They surveyed the northern part of the sea in 1848, the same year that a larger warship, the Constantine, was assembled. Commanded by Lt. Alexey Butakov (Алексей Бутаков), the Constantine completed the survey of the entire Aral Sea over the next two years. Exiled Ukrainian poet and painter Taras Shevchenko participated in the expedition and produced a number of sketches.

In 1851 two newly built steamers arrived from Sweden. The geological surveys had found no coal deposits in the area so the Military Governor-General of Orenburg Vasily Perovsky ordered an "as large as possible supply" of saxaul (Haloxylon ammodendron, a desert shrub akin to the creosote bush) to be collected in Aralsk for the new steamers. Unfortunately, saxaul wood proved not to be a suitable fuel and in the later years the Aral Flotilla was provisioned, at substantial cost, by coal from the Donbas.

Irrigation canals

In the early 1960s, as part of the Soviet government plan for cotton, or "white gold", to become a major export, the Amu Darya river in the south and the Syr Darya river in the east were diverted from feeding the Aral Sea to irrigate the desert in an attempt to grow cotton, melons, rice and cereals. This temporarily succeeded, and in 1988, Uzbekistan was the world's largest exporter of cotton. Cotton production is still Uzbekistan's main cash crop, accounting for 17% of its exports in 2006.

Large scale construction of irrigation canals began in the 1930s and was greatly increased in the 1960s. Many canals were poorly built, allowing leakage and evaporation. Between 30 and 75% of the water from the Qaraqum Canal, the largest in Central Asia, went to waste. It was estimated in 2012 that only 12% of Uzbekistan's irrigation canal length was waterproofed. Only 28% of interfarm irrigation channels, and 21% of onfarm channels have anti-infiltration linings, which retain on average 15% more water than unlined channels. Only 77% of farm intakes have flow gauges.

The amount of water taken for irrigation from the rivers doubled between 1960 and 2000. In the first half of the 20th century prior to the irrigation, the sea's water level above sea level held steady at 53 m. By 2010 the large Aral was 27 m and the small Aral 43 m above sea level.

The disappearance of the lake was no surprise to the Soviets, they expected it to happen long before. As early as 1964, Aleksandr Asarin at the Hydroproject Institute pointed out that the lake was doomed, explaining, "It was part of the five-year plans, approved by the council of ministers and the Politburo. Nobody on a lower level would dare to say a word contradicting those plans, even if it was the fate of the Aral Sea."

The reaction to the predictions varied. Some Soviet experts apparently considered the Aral to be "nature's error", and a Soviet engineer said in 1968, "it is obvious to everyone that the evaporation of the Aral Sea is inevitable." On the other hand, starting in the 1960s, a large-scale project was proposed to redirect part of the flow of the rivers of the Ob basin to Central Asia over a gigantic canal system. Refilling of the Aral Sea was considered one of the project's main goals. However, due to its staggering costs and the negative public opinion in Russia proper, the federal authorities had abandoned the project by 1986.

From 1960 to 1998, the sea's surface area shrank by 60%, and its volume by 80%. Its salinity increased; by 1990 it was at 376 g/L. (By comparison, seawater is typically 35 g/L, and the Dead Sea between 300 and 350 g/L.)

In 1987, the lake split into two separate bodies of water: the North Aral Sea (the Lesser Sea, or Small Aral Sea) and the South Aral Sea (the Greater Sea, or Large Aral Sea). In June 1991, Uzbekistan gained independence from the Soviet Union. Craig Murray, UK ambassador to Uzbekistan in 2002, attributes the shrinkage of the Aral Sea in the 1990s to president Islam Karimov's cotton policy. The enormous irrigation system was massively wasteful, crop rotation was not used, and huge quantities of pesticides and fertilizer were applied. The runoff from the fields washed these chemicals into the shrinking sea, creating severe pollution and health problems. As demand for cotton increased, the government applied more pesticides and fertilizer to the monocultured and depleted soil. Forced labor was used and profits were siphoned off by the powerful and well-connected.

In 2003, the South Aral further divided into eastern and western basins. The waters in the deepest parts of the sea were saltier and didn't mix with the top waters, so only the top of the sea was heated in the summer, resulting in faster evaporation than had been predicted. A plan was announced for the recovery of the North Aral Sea by building Dike Kokaral, a concrete dam separating the two halves of the Aral Sea.

Dike Kokaral was completed in 2005 and, as of 2006, some recovery of sea level had been recorded.

Impact on environment, economy, and public health 
The Aral Sea is considered an example of ecosystem collapse. The ecosystems of the Aral Sea and the river deltas feeding into it have been nearly destroyed, largely because of the salinity being dramatically higher than ocean water. The receding sea has left huge plains covered with salt and toxic chemicals from weapons testing, industrial projects, and runoff of pesticides and fertilizer.  Because of the shrinking water source and worsening water and soil quality, pesticides were increasingly used from the 1960s to raise cotton yield, which further polluted the water with toxins (e.g. DDT). Industrial pollution also resulted in PCB and heavy-metal contamination.

Owing to the insufficiency of water left in the Aral sea, concentrations of these pollutants rose drastically both in the remaining water and in the dry beds. This resulted in wind-borne toxic dust that spread quite widely. People living in the lower parts of the river basins and former shore zones ingested pollutants through drinking local water and inhaling contaminated dust. Furthermore, due to absorption by plants and livestock, toxins — many of which bioaccumulate and are not easily broken down or excreted by the liver and kidneys — entered the food chain. Inhabitants of the surrounding areas commonly experience a shortage of fresh water, and health problems are widespread — including high rates of certain cancers, respiratory illnesses including tuberculosis (mostly drug resistant), digestive disorders, anaemia, and infectious diseases. Liver, kidney, and eye problems may also be due to the toxic dust storms. Together, this presented an unusually high fatality rate among vulnerable age groups: child mortality stood at 75 per 1,000 in 2009, while maternal mortality was 12 in every 1,000.

The dust storms have also contributed to water shortages through salt deposition. Overusing pesticides on crops to preserve yields has exacerbated this. Crops are destroyed where salt is deposited by the wind. The most heavily affected fields must be flushed with water four times per day to remove salt and toxic matter. A 1998 study indicated that few crops (besides fodder) tolerate the degradation, restricting what Kazakhstan farmers now choose to seed.

Inland seas and lakes generally moderate a region's climate through humidification, regulation of thermal energy, and peri-winter albedo effects. Loss of water in the Aral Sea has changed surface temperatures and wind patterns. This has led to a broader annual temperature range (about a 4 to 12 °C broadening) and more dust in storms locally and regionally.

Biology
The Aral Sea fishing industry, which at its peak employed some 40,000 and reportedly produced one-sixth of the Soviet Union's entire fish catch, has been devastated. In the 1980s commercial harvests were becoming unsustainable, and by 1987 commercial harvest became nonexistent. Due to the declining sea levels, salinity levels became too high for the 20 native fish species to survive. The only fish that could survive the high-salinity levels was flounder.  Also, as water has receded, former fishing towns along the original shores have become ship graveyards.

Aral, originally the main fishing port, is now about 15 kilometres from the sea and has seen its population decline dramatically since the beginning of the crisis. The town of Moynaq in Uzbekistan had a thriving harbour and fishing industry that employed about 30,000 people; now it lies 30–90 kilometres from the shore. Fishing boats lie scattered on the dry dusty land that was once covered by water; many have been there for 20 years.

The South Aral Sea remains too saline to host any species other than halotolerant organisms. The South Aral has been incapable of supporting fish since the late 1990s, when the flounder were killed by rising salinity levels.

Also destroyed is the muskrat-trapping industry in the deltas of the Amu Darya and Syr Darya, which used to yield as many as 500,000 pelts a year.

Vulnerable populations
Women and children are the most vulnerable populations in this environmental health crisis due to the highly polluted and salinated water used for drinking and the dried seabed. Toxic chemicals associated with pesticide use have been found in blood and breast milk of mothers; specifically organochlorides, polychlorinated biphenyl compounds (PCBs), DDT compounds, and TCDD. These toxins can be, and often are, passed on to the children of these mothers, resulting in low birthweight and congenital abnormalities. The rate of infants being born with abnormalities is five times higher in this region than in European countries. The Aral Sea region has 26% of its children born at low birthweight, which is two standard deviations away from a national population study gathered by the WHO.

Exposures to toxic chemicals from the dry seabed and polluted water have caused other health issues in women and children. Renal tubular dysfunction has become a large health concern in children in the Aral Sea region as it is showing extremely high prevalence rates. Renal tubular dysfunction can also be related to growth and developmental stunting. This, in conjunction with the already high rate of low-birthweight children and children born with abnormalities, contributes to severe negative health effects and outcomes for children. These issues are compounded by the lack of research on maternal and child health effects caused by the demise of the Aral Sea. For example, only 26 English-language peer-reviewed articles and four reports on children's health were produced between 1994 and 2008. In addition, there is a lack of health infrastructure and resources in the Aral Sea region to combat the health issues that have arisen.

There is a lack of medication and equipment in many medical facilities, so health professionals do not have access to the necessary supplies to do their jobs in the Kazakhstan and Uzbekistan regions. There is also meager development of a health information system that would allow for extensive research or surveillance of emerging health issues due to Aral Sea issues. An absence of a primary care approach in the health systems of this region also hinders services and access that could prevent and treat issues stemming from the Aral Sea crisis, especially in women and children.

The impoverished are also particularly vulnerable to the environmental and health related effects of changes to the Aral Sea. These populations were most likely to reside downstream from the Basin and in former coastal communities. They were also among the first to be detrimentally affected, representing at least 4.4 million people in the region. Considered to have the worst health in this region, their plight was not helped when their fishery livelihoods vanished with the decreasing levels of water and loss of many aquatic species. Thus, those in poverty are entrenched in a vicious cycle.

Solution

Proposed environmental solutions
Many different solutions to the problems have been suggested over the years, varying in feasibility and cost, including:
Improving the quality of irrigation canals
Using alternative cotton species that require less water
Promoting non-agricultural economic development in upstream countries
Using fewer chemicals on the cotton
Cultivating crops other than cotton
Redirecting water from the Volga, Ob and Irtysh rivers to restore the Aral Sea to its former size in 20–30 years at a cost of US$30–50 billion
Pumping sea water into the Aral Sea from the Caspian Sea via a pipeline, and diluting it with fresh water from local catchment areas

In January 1994, Kazakhstan, Uzbekistan, Turkmenistan, Tajikistan, and Kyrgyzstan signed a deal to pledge 1% of their budgets to help the sea recover.

In March 2000, UNESCO presented their "Water-related vision for the Aral Sea basin for the year 2025".

By 2006, the World Bank's restoration projects, especially in the North Aral, were giving rise to some unexpected, tentative relief in what had been an extremely pessimistic picture.

Restoration strategies

Technology
Funded in part by the UNDP, implementations in Kazakhstan such as laser levelling and irrigation optimization using energy-efficient technologies has shown effectiveness.

Aral Sea Basin Programme - 1
The future of the Aral Sea and the responsibility for its survival are now in the hands of the five countries: Kazakhstan, Uzbekistan, Tajikistan, Kyrgyzstan, and Turkmenistan. In 1994, they adopted the Aral Sea Basin Programme.  The Programme's four objectives are:
To stabilize the environment of the Aral Sea Basin
To rehabilitate the disaster area around the sea
To improve the management of the international waters of the Aral Sea Basin
To build the capacity of institutions at the regional and national level to advance the programme's aims

ASBP: Phase One
The first phase of the plan effectively began with the first involvement from the World Bank in 1992, and was in operation until 1997.  It was ineffectual for a number of reasons, but mainly because it was focused on improving directly the land around the Aral Sea, whilst not intervening in the water usage upstream. There was considerable concern amongst the Central Asian governments, which realised the importance of the Aral Sea in the ecosystem and the economy of Central Asia, and they were prepared to cooperate, but they found it difficult to implement the procedures of the plan. 

This is due in part to a lack of co-operation among the affected people. The water flowing into the Aral Sea has long been considered an important commodity, and trade agreements have been made to supply the downstream communities with water in the spring and summer months for irrigation. In return, they supply the upstream countries with fuel during the winter, instead of storing water during the warm months for hydroelectric purposes in winter. However, very few legal obligations are binding these contracts, particularly on an international stage.

ASBP: Phase Two
Phase Two of the Aral Sea Basin programme followed in 1998 and ran for five years. The main shortcomings of phase two were due to its lack of integration with the local communities involved. The scheme was drawn up by the World Bank, government representatives, and various technical experts, without consulting those who would be affected. An example of this was the public awareness initiatives, which were seen as propagandist attempts by people with little care or understanding of their situation.  These failures have led to the introduction of a new plan, funded by a number of institutions, including the five countries involved and the World Bank.

ASBP: Phase Three
In 1997, a new plan was conceived which would continue with the previous restoration efforts of the Aral Sea. The main aims of this phase are to improve the irrigation systems currently in place, whilst targeting water management at a local level. The largest project in this phase is the North Aral Sea Project, a direct effort to recover the northern region of the Aral Sea. The North Aral Sea Project's main initiative is the construction of a dam across the Berg Strait, a deep channel which connects the North Aral Sea to the South Aral Sea.

Aral Sea Basin Programme – 2
On 6 October 2002, the Heads of States met again to revise the ASBP program.  ASBP-2 was in place from 2003 to 2010. The main purpose of the ASBP-2 was to set up projects that covered a vast amount of environmental, socioeconomic and water management issues. The ASBP-2 was financed by organization such as the UNDP, World Bank, USAID, Asian Development Bank, and the governments of Switzerland, Japan, Finland, Norway and others.  Over 2 billion US Dollars was provided by the IFAS country members to the program.

Aral Sea Basin Programme – 3
On 28 April 2009, the Head of States came together with the Interstate commission for Water Coordination, Interstate Commission for Sustainable Development and National Experts and donors to develop the ASBP-3.  This Program was in effect from 2011- 2015.  The main purpose of the ASBP-3 was to improve the environmental and socio-economic situation of the Aral Sea Basin. The four program prioritizes were:
Direction one: Integrated Use of Water Resources 
Direction two: Environmental protection 
Direction three: Socio-economic Development 
Direction four: Improving the institutional and legal instruments

ASBP-3: Direction One
Direction One's main purpose is to propose program that focus on addressing transboundary water resources management, establishment of monitoring systems and addressing safety concerns in water facilities. Examples of programs that have been proposed include:
"Developing proposals to optimize the management and use of water resources in Central Asia, taking into account environmental factors, effects of climate change to meet the national interests of the Aral Sea basin."
"Improving the quality of hydrometeorological services for weather-dependent sectors of the economy of Central Asia."
"Creating a database and computer models for the management of transboundary water resources."
"Assisting the countries in reducing the risk of natural disasters, including through the strengthening of regional cooperation, improve disaster preparedness and response."

ASBP-3: Direction Two
Directions two's main focus is on addressing the issues related to environmental protection and improvement of the environment. Areas of interest include:
"The environment in the deltas of the Syr Darya and Amu Darya improved."
"Mountain environments improved."
"The environment and productivity of pastures improved."
"A regional information system on the environment established."

ASBP-3: Direction Three
Direction three looks to address socio-economic issues by focusing on education and public health, improving unemployment rates, improving water systems, increasing sustainable development and improving living conditions.  The expected outputs are:
"An improved access to safe drinking water."
"For the rural population: establishment and/or development of private small enterprises, creation of new jobs, and increased labor efficiency."
"An improvement in the quality of medical services"
"An improvement in the effectiveness and quality of education in schools and pre-school facilities in rural areas."

ASBP-3: Direction Four
Direction Four aims to address issues related to institutional development and the development of policies and strategies that relate to sustainable development and public awareness.  Expected outputs include:
"Conditions for a transparent and mutually beneficial regional dialogue and cooperation, including setting up a sectorial dialogue between governments established."
"A Prototype of the single information and analysis system for the water sector established."
"A Communication Strategy for stakeholders and the public established." 
"Training systems for the water sector and the hydrometeorological services in Central Asia improved."

North Aral Sea restoration work

Work is being done to restore in part the North Aral Sea. Irrigation works on the Syr Darya have been repaired and improved to increase its water flow, and in October 2003, the Kazakh government announced a plan to build Dike Kokaral, a concrete dam separating the two halves of the Aral Sea. Work on this dam was completed in August 2005; since then, the water level of the North Aral has risen, and its salinity has decreased. , some recovery of sea level has been recorded, sooner than expected. "The dam has caused the small Aral's sea level to rise swiftly to 38 m (125 ft), from a low of less than 30 m (98 ft), with 42 m (138 ft) considered the level of viability."

Economically significant stocks of fish have returned, and observers who had written off the North Aral Sea as an environmental disaster were surprised by unexpected reports that, in 2006, its returning waters were already partly reviving the fishing industry and producing catches for export as far as Ukraine. The improvements to the fishing industry were largely due to the drop in the average salinity of the sea from 30 grams to 8 grams per liter; this drop in salinity prompted the return of almost 24 freshwater species. The restoration also reportedly gave rise to long-absent rain clouds and possible microclimate changes, bringing tentative hope to an agricultural sector swallowed by a regional dustbowl, and some expansion of the shrunken sea.

The sea's depth increased from 30 meters (98 ft) in 2003 to 42 meters (138 ft) in 2008." Now, a second dam is to be built based on a World Bank loan to Kazakhstan, with the start of construction initially slated for 2009 and postponed to 2011, to further expand the shrunken Northern Aral, eventually reducing the distance to Aralsk to only . Then, it was planned to build a canal spanning the last 6 km, to reconnect the withered former port of Aralsk to the sea.

On 15 June 2021 the Central Communications Service of Kazakhstan announced that they plan to plant saxaul trees on one million hectares of the drained bottom of the Aral Sea as part of efforts to stop dust storms on the region. Other efforts include expanding the sea's water mirror.

Future of South Aral Sea

The South Aral Sea, half of which lies in Uzbekistan, was abandoned to its fate. Most of Uzbekistan's part of the Aral Sea is completely shriveled up. Only excess water from the North Aral Sea is periodically allowed to flow into the largely dried-up South Aral Sea through a sluice in the dyke.  Discussions had been held on recreating a channel between the somewhat improved North and the desiccated South, along with uncertain wetland restoration plans throughout the region, but political will is lacking. Unlike Kazakhstan, which has partially revived its part of the Aral Sea, Uzbekistan shows no signs of abandoning the Amu Darya river to irrigate their cotton, and is moving toward oil exploration in the drying South Aral seabed.

Attempts to mitigate the effects of desertification include planting vegetation in the newly exposed seabed; however, intermittent flooding of the eastern basin is likely to prove problematic for any development. Redirecting what little flow there is from the Amu Darya to the western basin may salvage fisheries there while relieving the flooding of the eastern basin.

Institutional bodies
The Interstate Commission for Water Coordination of Central Asia (ICWC) was formed on 18 February 1992 to formally unite Kazakhstan, Kyrgyzstan, Tajikistan, Turkmenistan and Uzbekistan in the hopes of solving environmental, as well as socioeconomic problems in the Aral Sea region. The River Basin Organizations (the BVOs) of the Syr Darya and Amu Darya rivers were institutions called upon by the ICWC to help manage water resources. According to the ICWC, the main objectives of the body are:
 River basin management
 Water allocation without conflict
 Organization of water conservation on transboundary water courses
 Interaction with hydrometeorological services of the countries on flow forecast and account
 Introduction of automation into head structures
 Regular work on ICWC and its bodies' activity advancement
 Interstate agreements preparation
 International relations
 Scientific research
 Training

The International Fund for Saving the Aral Sea (IFAS) was developed on 23 March 1993, by the ICWC to raise funds for the projects under Aral Sea Basin programmes. The IFAS was meant to finance programmes to save the sea and improve on environmental issues associated with the basin's drying. This programme has had some success with joint summits of the countries involved and finding funding from the World Bank to implement projects; however, it faces many challenges, such as enforcement and slowing progress.

Vozrozhdeniya Island

Vozrozhdeniya (Russian for rebirth) Island is a former island of the Aral Sea or South Aral Sea. Due to the ongoing shrinkage of the Aral, it became first a peninsula in mid-2001 and finally part of the mainland. Other islands like Kokaral and Barsa-Kelmes shared a similar fate. Since the disappearance of the Southeast Aral in 2008, Vozrozhdeniya Island effectively no longer exists as a distinct geographical feature. The area is now shared by Kazakhstan and Uzbekistan.

In 1948, a top-secret Soviet bioweapons laboratory was established on the island, in the centre of the Aral Sea which is now disputed territory between Kazakhstan and Uzbekistan. The exact history, functions and current status of this facility are still unclear, but bio-agents tested there included Bacillus anthracis, Coxiella burnetii, Francisella tularensis, Brucella suis, Rickettsia prowazekii, Variola major (smallpox), Yersinia pestis, botulinum toxin, and Venezuelan equine encephalitis virus.

In 1971, weaponized smallpox from the island reached a nearby ship, which then allowed the virus to spread to the city of Aral. Ten people there were infected, of whom three died, and a massive vaccination effort involving 50,000 inhabitants ensued (see Aral smallpox incident). The bioweapons base was abandoned in 1992 following the disintegration of the Soviet Union the previous year. Scientific expeditions proved this had been a site for production, testing and later dumping of pathogenic weapons. In 2002, through a project organized by the United States and with Uzbekistan's assistance, 10 anthrax burial sites were decontaminated. According to the Kazakh Scientific Center for Quarantine and Zoonotic Infections, all burial sites of anthrax were decontaminated.

Oil and gas exploration
Ergash Shaismatov, the deputy prime minister of Uzbekistan, announced on 30 August 2006, that the Uzbek government and an international consortium consisting of state-run Uzbekneftegaz, LUKoil Overseas, Petronas, Korea National Oil Corporation, and China National Petroleum Corporation signed a production-sharing agreement to explore and develop oil and gas fields in the Aral Sea, saying, "The Aral Sea is largely unknown, but it holds a lot of promise in terms of finding oil and gas. There is risk, of course, but we believe in the success of this unique project." The consortium was created in September 2005.

As of 1 June 2010, 500,000 cubic meters of gas had been extracted, from 3 km down.

Films
The plight of the Aral coast was portrayed in the 1989 film Stray Dogs by Soviet director Dmitri Svetozarov. The film was shot on location in an actual ghost town located near the Aral Sea, showing scenes of abandoned buildings and scattered vessels.

In 2000, the MirrorMundo foundation produced a documentary film called Delta Blues about the problems arising from the drying up of the sea.

In June 2007, BBC World broadcast a documentary called Back From the Brink? made by Borna Alikhani and Guy Creasey, which showed some of the changes in the region since the introduction of the Aklak Dam.

Bakhtyar Khudojnazarov's 2012 movie Waiting for the Sea deals with the impacts on people's life in a fishing town at the shore of the Aral Sea.

In 2012 Christoph Pasour and Alfred Diebold produced an 85-minute film with the title "From the glaciers to the Aral Sea", which shows the water management system in the Aral Sea basin and in particular the situation around the Aral Sea. The film was first screened at the 6th World Water Forum in Marseille, France, in 2012 and is now available on the website: www.waterunites-ca.org and on Alfred Diebold's YouTube channel: waterunitesca.

In October 2013, Al Jazeera produced a documentary film called People of The Lake, directed by Ensar Altay, describing the current situation.

In 2014, director Po Powell shot much of the footage for the Pink Floyd single "Louder than Words" video near the remains of the Aral Sea on the border between Kazakhstan and Uzbekistan.

In October 2018, the BBC produced a programme called Fashion's Dirty Secrets, a large part of which shows the extent of the shrinking Aral and its consequences.

See also

List of drying lakes
Dead Sea
Tulare Lake – California's largest lake, drained between 1880 and 1970
Sudd – a large marshland in Africa, site of another planned large-scale draining project, the Jonglei Canal
Draining of the Mesopotamian marshes – a similar water diversion project in Iraq

Notes

References

Sources

 

Ryszard Kapuscinski, Imperium, Granta, 2019,

External links
Aral Sea Foundation
Aral Sea from Space (time lapse)

 
Ancient lakes
Endorheic lakes of Asia
Environmental disasters in Asia
Geography of Central Asia
Shrunken lakes
Former lakes of Asia
Lakes of Kazakhstan
Lakes of Uzbekistan
Saline lakes of Asia
Kazakhstan–Uzbekistan border
International lakes of Asia
Articles containing video clips
IUCN Red List of Ecosystems